A pollera is a Spanish term for a big one-piece skirt used mostly in traditional festivities and folklore throughout Spanish-speaking Latin America. Polleras are made from different materials, such as cotton or wool and tend to have colorful decorations. Most of the decorations are embroidered, flowers and regional animals are among the most common designs found in polleras.

Polleras are a form of Spanish colonial dress enforced sometime between the sixteenth and seventeenth centuries on indigenous populations in the Andes by hacienda owners or hacendados. Traditional polleras come from peasant dress from southern Spanish regions, like Andalusia. Today, polleras are associated with indigenous and folkloric forms of dress.

Spain
In Spain, it is a skirt worn by women almost a century ago. They are made of wool or cotton and are very colorful.  The large gathered skirt is generally white with two or three ruffles which have a floral design or embroidery.  The top has several ruffles as well on the shoulders and has inlaid yarn.  There is a large pompom matching the yarn in the front and back of the top. The yarn also matches several large ribbons at the waist and the slippers that go with the outfit. The clothing includes a headdress called a tembleque (or tembeleque) which is made of beads attached to a spring so that they tremble when the wearer dances.

Panama
In Panama, fully handmade polleras are worn during festivals or celebrations. They are mainly made of cotton and linen. Normally, the dominant color is white, and have colorful flower designs as embellishment.
 
A single pollera can cost from several hundred to several thousand dollars and take up to a year or two to create, depending on its complexity. Gold and pearl jewelry such as mosquetas (made up of concentric, alternating circles), combs, collars and tembleques (hair jewelry in the shape of three-dimensional flowers or insects such as butterflies) that may be worn with a pollera, are generally passed down as heirlooms through generations.

Panamanian polleras are made up of an upper and lower section, the latter of which is the skirt of the pollera.

The adornments are embroidery or needlework on the skirt and upper part that are sewn entirely by hand in several steps that progressively build the desired effect. Each pollera is custom-made and handmade by an artisan. 

There are several kinds of Panamanian polleras, each of which may vary by region, such as:

Pollera montuna, which was originally used in community events and festivals. It is moderately elaborate, with adornments.
Pollera de lujo or de gala con labor (meaning luxurious, for events considered to be prestigious, with needlework), a very intricate, complex and expensive pollera, with a price of up to 25,600 USD
Pollera de gala sin labor (intended for events considered to be prestigious, without needlework), which is accessorized according to region
Pollera tumba hombre (meaning (capable of) fainting a man), which has narrow vertical alternating colored stripes on the skirt
Pollera congo, symbolic of the large population of African descent in Panama, with a skirt and upper part made from strategically arranged fabric scraps sewn together, occasionally worn with a crown. This is the only type of pollera that doesn't normally have white as its dominant color, and is normally worn with flowers that are fresh, dried or artificial in place of jewelry, together with collars made of materials other than gold.
Pollera de basquiña, with a much narrower skirt and a plain upper part, made from cloth and buttons considered to be luxurious such as gold buttons

On 22 July of every year there is a pollera festival.

Bolivia and Peru

In Bolivia and Peru the word pollera denotes a pleated skirt very much associated with the urban mestizo and the rural indigenous classes where women usually wear this garment (nowadays also instead of the woven indigenous dresses). The urban pollera typical of the Bolivian altiplano should be made of 8 meters of cloth and it is worn with 4-5 embroidered underskirts.

The skirt worn under the top pollera is called the fuste, under the fuste (in the third skirt) is typically made from wool. There are still quite a lot of women around who wear this skirt which originates from the Spanish rural dresses and for the Carnaval de Oruro or Virgen de la Candelaría festival in Peru, and other festivities. During traditional festivities women who don't usually wear it, put it on for the dancing.

Sources

References 

Latin American clothing
Latin American culture
Panamanian culture
Folk costumes
Colombian clothing
Chilean clothing
Bolivian clothing
Peruvian clothing
Skirts